Calliotropis basileus is a species of sea snail, a marine gastropod mollusk in the family Eucyclidae.

Description

Distribution
This species occurs in the Pacific Ocean off New Caledonia and Fiji.

References

 Vilvens C. 2004. Description of four new species of Calliotropis (Gastropoda: Trochidae: Eucyclinae: Calliotropini) from New Caledonia, Fiji and Vanuatu. Novapex 5(1): 19–31
 Vilvens C. (2007) New records and new species of Calliotropis from Indo-Pacific. Novapex 8 (Hors Série 5): 1–72

External links

basileus
Gastropods described in 2004